Nads may refer to:

Nads, slang for gonads
Nad's, Australian hair removal brand
Rafael Nadal, Spanish tennis player nicknamed Nads
National Advanced Driving Simulator, or NADS
Neutron Acceptance Diagram Shading, or NADS
Sodium lauryl sulfate, or NaDS